Kotaro Takahashi (高橋航太郎, Takahashi Kōtarō, born 15 March 1994) is a Japanese swimmer. He competed in the men's 4 × 200 metre freestyle relay at the 2020 Summer Olympics.

References

External links
 

1994 births
Living people
Japanese male freestyle swimmers
Olympic swimmers of Japan
Swimmers at the 2020 Summer Olympics
Sportspeople from Shizuoka Prefecture
People from Shizuoka (city)
21st-century Japanese people